UP TV (stylized as UPtv; formerly GMC TV and originally Gospel Music Channel) is an American basic cable television network that was founded to have a focus on gospel music. It has expanded into family-friendly original movies, series, and specials. Up TV is owned by InterMedia Partners. The name and logo are a reference to Uplifting Entertainment, one of the channel's content providers.

As of February 2015, the channel is available to approximately 67.6 million pay television households (58.1% of households with television) in the United States.

History
The Gospel Music Channel was founded in 2004 by Charles Humbard, the son of televangelist Rex Humbard. It was devoted to gospel music. With Brad Siegel, former president of Turner Broadcasting's Turner Entertainment Networks, as vice chairman, Humbard launched GMC on October 30, 2004. Gospel Music Channel programmed gospel/Christian music, featuring diverse styles, including traditional and contemporary gospel, Christian rock and pop, southern gospel, and Christian metal. Each weeknight, the network's lineup featured a different genre of music.

In addition to music video blocks, the network began to produce original shows, such as Faith and Fame (artist biographies), Front Row Live (concerts), and America Sings (singing competition).  The network aired Gospel and Christian music industry award shows, including The Stellar Awards (urban gospel) and The GMA Dove Awards.

The network was re-branded on June 1, 2013 (the re-branding had been scheduled to occur on September 1, 2013).

Programming

In the transition before the name-change, in 2010, the channel began carrying popular syndicated series such as Cosby, Dr. Quinn, Medicine Woman, and The Waltons, along with Judging Amy. The channel also has aired films such as The Secret Garden, The Trial, and Pay It Forward, as well as Christian movies such as Facing the Giants, The Perfect Summer, and Fireproof. On Christmas Eve and Day, the network airs a Yule Log loop with holiday songs from Contemporary Christian artists.  Similar to competing family networks such as INSP and Hallmark Channel, UPtv now programs multiple weeks of family-friendly Christmas movies through the holidays in December. Easter movies also populate the programming schedule through April.

The channel continues to air popular syndicated series such as Gilmore Girls, America's Funniest Home Videos, Whose Line Is It Anyway?, and Home Improvement. On December 3, 2014, Up announced its first original scripted series Ties That Bind, which was canceled after its first season. Ties That Bind starred Kelli Williams, Jonathan Scarfe, Dion Johnstone, Matreya Scarrwene, Rhys Matthew Bond, Natasha Calis, Mitchell Kummen and guest stars Luke Perry and Jason Priestley. Other original series include Bringing Up Bates and the Canadian import Heartland. UPtv original movies include Love Finds You in Sugarcreek, Ohio (starring Kelly McGillis), The Town That Came A-Courtin' (starring Valerie Harper), Finding Normal, My Mother's Future Husband, Raising Izzie, and Saving Westbrook High.  UPtv original specials include K-LOVE Music City Christmas (hosted by Candace Cameron Bure).

On October 7, 2014, UPtv pulled their airings of repeats of the television drama 7th Heaven, due to allegations of child molestation against the series lead actor, Stephen Collins. 7th Heaven briefly returned to UPtv in December 2014; however, it was quickly removed from the schedule. UPtv CEO Charley Humbard explained, "We brought the show back because many viewers expressed they could separate allegations against one actor from the fictional series itself.  As it turns out, they cannot." In late May 2015, UPtv resumed weekday airings of two episodes of 7th Heaven, from 5 to 7p.m. ET; by September 2015, marathon and daily airings of the series had resumed.

In September 2015, the network acquired the rights to Gilmore Girls and began to air it in both daily and marathon forms of scheduling, including a full-series marathon on Thanksgiving week 2016 to lead into the series' Netflix revival. It also acquired the repeat rights to NBC's 2010 drama Parenthood a year after the demise of Viacom's NickMom, complementing Gilmore Girls, as both series starred actress Lauren Graham.

In April 2016, the channel picked up the rerun rights to the Tom Bergeron era of America's Funniest Home Videos.

In 2017, the network acquired rights to reruns of Whose Line Is It Anyway?, both the Drew Carey run of the past and the current run hosted by Aisha Tyler. Both versions carry content disclaimers depending on episode content.

In May 2018, UPtv acquired reruns of Home Improvement; at around the same time, reruns of this show also began airing on the Viacom-owned cable network CMT, which at the time had just suspended airing reruns of Roseanne (that show later returned to that network's schedule). At around this same time, UPtv also quietly retired its "We Get Family" slogan on-air.

In March 2019, UPtv acquired reruns of The Librarians; around the same time, they introduced a new emoji-based campaign and branding. In June 2019, UPtv acquired reruns of Reba, and premiered it on August 2, 2019.

In the winter of 2019, after INSP lost the rights to Little House on the Prairie'', this channel picked up the series and began airing episodes in sequence from the pilot movie onwards during several marathon airings in late December. In January the series settled in for its normal 4-episode block run from 8a.m. to noon ET.

References

External links

Television networks in the United States
Evangelical television networks
English-language television stations in the United States
Gospel music media
Television channels and stations established in 2004